Phosphatidylinositol-4,5-bisphosphate 3-kinase catalytic subunit delta isoform also known as phosphoinositide 3-kinase (PI3K) delta isoform or p110δ is an enzyme that in humans is encoded by the PIK3CD gene.

p110δ regulates immune function. In contrast to the other class IA PI3Ks p110α and p110β, p110δ is principally expressed in leukocytes (white blood cells). Genetic and pharmacological inactivation of p110δ has revealed that this enzyme is important for the function of T cells, B cell, mast cells and neutrophils. Hence, p110δ is a promising target for drugs that aim to prevent or treat inflammation, autoimmunity and transplant rejection.

Phosphoinositide 3-kinases (PI3Ks) phosphorylate the 3-prime OH position of the inositol ring of inositol lipids. The class I PI3Ks display a broad phosphoinositide lipid substrate specificity and include p110α, p110β and p110γ. p110α and p110β interact with SH2/SH3-domain-containing p85 adaptor proteins and with GTP-bound Ras.

Biochemistry 
Like the other class IA PI3Ks, p110δ is a catalytic subunit, whose activity and subcellular localisation are controlled by an associated p85α, p55α, p50α  or p85β regulatory subunit. The p55γ regulatory subunit is not thought to be expressed at significant levels in immune cells. There is no evidence for selective association between p110α, p110β or p110δ for any particular regulatory subunit. The class IA regulatory subunits (collectively referred to here as p85) bind to proteins that have been phosphorylated on tyrosines. Tyrosine kinases often operate near the plasma membrane and hence control the recruitment of p110δ to the plasma membrane where its substrate PtdIns(4,5)P2 is found. The conversion of PtdIns(4,5)P2 to PtdIns(3,4,5)P3 triggers signal transduction cascades controlled by PKB (also known as Akt), Tec family kinases and other proteins that contain PH domains. In immune cells, antigen receptors, cytokine receptors and costimulatory and accessory receptors stimulate tyrosine kinase activity and hence all have the potential to initiate PI3K signalling.

Functions 
For reasons that are not well understood, p110δ appears to be activated in preference to p110α and p110β in a number of immune cells. The following is a brief summary of the role of p110δ in selected leukocyte subsets.

T cells 
In T cells, the antigen receptor (TCR) and costimulatory receptors (CD28 and ICOS) are thought to be main receptors responsible for recruiting and activating p110δ. Genetic inactivation of p110δ in mice causes T cells to be less responsive to antigen as determined by their reduced ability to proliferate and secrete interleukin 2. T cell specific deletion of p110δ has revealed its role in antibody responses.
This may in part result from incomplete assembly of other signalling proteins at the immune synapse. The TCR cannot stimulate the phosphorylation of Akt in that absence of p110δ activity.

B cells 
p110δ is a regulator of B cell proliferation and function. p110δ-deficient mice have deficient antibody responses. They also lack to B cell subsets: B1 cells (found in body cavities such as the peritoneum) and marginal zone B cells, found in the periphery of spleen follicles).

Mast cells 
p110δ controls mast cell release of the granules responsible for allergic reactions. Thus inhibition of p110δ reduces allergic responses.

Neutrophils 
In conjunction with p110γ, p110δ controls the release of reactive oxygen species in neutrophils.

Dendritic cells 
p110δ controls lipopolysaccharide induced Toll-like-receptor-4 mediated innate immune responses in dendritic cells and mice carrying an inactive p110δ is susceptible to lipopolysaccharide mediated endotoxin shock.

Activated PI3K delta syndrome 
Inherited mutations in the PIK3CD gene which increase p110δ catalytic activity cause a primary immunodeficiency syndrome called APDS or PASLI.

Pharmacology 
US pharmaceutical company ICOS produced a selective inhibitor of p110δ called IC87114. This inhibitor selectively impairs B cell, mast cell and neutrophil functions and is therefore a potential immune-modulator.

The p110δ inhibitor idelalisib was developed by Gilead Sciences. Idelalisib in combination with rituximab showed favourable progression free survival in a phase III clinical trial for chronic lymphocytic leukemia (CLL) compared with patients that received rituximab and placebo.

In July 2014 idelalisib was approved by the FDA as a treatment for CLL patients.

In September 2017 copanlisib, inhibiting predominantly p110α and p110δ, got FDA approval for the treatment of adult patients with relapsed follicular lymphoma (FL) who have received at least two prior systemic therapies.

In September 2018 duvelisib was approved by the FDA as a treatment for relapsed or refractory CLL, and relapsed follicular lymphoma (FL) patients, who have received at least two prior therapies.

A 2015 study found that p110δ inhibitors had a side-effect of boosting mouse immune responses against multiple cancers, including both solid and hematological types. Breast cancer mice survival times nearly doubled and spread significantly less, with far fewer and smaller tumors. Post-surgical survival also improved. Subject immune systems could also develop an effective memory response, extending protection. p110δ inactivation in regulatory T cells unleashes CD8+ cytotoxic T cells.

Interactions 

PIK3CD interacts with PIK3R1, and PIK3R2.

See also 
Phosphoinositide 3-kinase inhibitor

References

Further reading 

 
 
 
 
 
 
 
 
 
 
 
 
 
 
 
 

EC 2.7.1
Immune system